Mark Osborne may refer to:

 Mark Osborne (cricketer) (born 1961), Australian cricketer
 Mark Osborne (ice hockey) (born 1961), Canadian ice hockey player
 Mark Osborne (filmmaker) (born 1970), American film director

See also
 Mark Osborn (born 1981), footballer